The Soap Museum (also called the Audi Soap Museum) is a museum in Sidon specialized in Levantine soaps. It is open since 2000 and managed by the Audi Foundation.

History
The soap workshop was originally built in Sidon by the Hammoud family in the 17th century. During the 19th century (around 1880), the Audi family became the owner of the soap workshop and turned it into a family residence. It was abandoned in the 1980s when the Lebanon War broke out and the ground floor was occupied by refugees. In 1996, the Audi Foundation started to restore the edifice. The Soap Museum opened in November 2000.

In November 2019, the museum opened a gift shop in Beyrouth.

Description

The Soap Museum traces the history of soap making in the region, its development and manufacturing techniques. Visitors can see a demonstration of how traditional olive oil soaps are made and learn about the history of the "hammam" (bath) traditions. 

A historical section of the museum introduces artifacts which were found during onsite excavation and which include remains of clay pipe heads dating from the 17th to 19th century as well as pottery fragments. The Museum building is an old soap factory built in the 17th century, although containing parts thought to date back to the 13th century.

The Audi Foundation is headquartered at the Soap Museum. The foundation works with the Mahmud al-Sharkass and his family to craft luxury soaps sold in the museum's gift shop.

Bibliography
The Olive Oil Soap - The Soap Museum, Fondation Audi, 2003

References

External links
Audi Foundation website

Museums in Lebanon
Industry museums
History museums in Lebanon
Sidon District
Tourism in Lebanon
Tourist attractions in Lebanon
Soaps